The 1930 Bulgarian State Football Championship was the seventh edition of the competition. It was consisted by 9 teams, and it was won by Slavia Sofia, who defeated Vladislav Varna 4–1 in the final. This was the club's second title.

Qualified teams
The winners from each OSO qualify for the State championship.

First round

|}

Quarter-finals

|}

Semi-finals

|}

Final

Notes

References
Bulgaria - List of final tables (RSSSF)

Bulgarian State Football Championship seasons
1
Bul